Amphidromus anhdaoorum is a species of medium-sized air-breathing tree snail, an arboreal gastropod mollusk in the family Camaenidae.

Morphology 
Medium-sized sinistral shell with black outer lip, yellow spiral band at base and red stripe around the umbilicus.

Distribution 
Đắk Lắk Province, Central Vietnam.

Habitat 
Around trees.

Etymology 
This species is named after Phạm Ngọc Anh and Lê Thị Hồng Đào  who provided the type material.

References 

anhdaoorum
Gastropods described in 2017